Ishtob was one of the small Syrian Kingdoms that made up Aram.
In 2 Samuel 10:6 it is listed as one of the kingdoms that Ammon hired soldiers from

Ishtob also means "man of Tob"

References
New International Version Bible

External links
Ishtob in the Bible

Hebrew Bible places